Jo Chang-je (born 10 October 1943) is a South Korean diver. He competed in the men's 10 metre platform event at the 1964 Summer Olympics.

References

1943 births
Living people
South Korean male divers
Olympic divers of South Korea
Divers at the 1964 Summer Olympics
Place of birth missing (living people)
Asian Games medalists in diving
Divers at the 1962 Asian Games
Medalists at the 1962 Asian Games
Asian Games bronze medalists for South Korea
20th-century South Korean people